Maya medicine concerns health and medicine among the ancient Maya civilization. It was a complex blend of mind, body, religion, ritual and science. Important to all, medicine was practiced only by a select few, who generally inherited their positions and received extensive education. These shamans acted as a medium between the physical world and spirit world. They practiced sorcery for the purpose of healing, foresight, and control over natural events. Since medicine was so closely related to religion, it was essential that Maya medicine men had vast medical knowledge and skill.

In understanding Maya medicine, it is important to recognize that the Maya equated sickness with the captivity of one's soul by supernatural beings, angered by some perceived misbehavior. For this reason, curing a sickness involved elements of ritual, cleansing and herbal remedy. Research of Maya ethno-medicine shows that though supernatural causes are related to illness, a large percentage of Maya medical texts are devoted to the treatment of symptoms based upon objective observations of the effects of certain plants on the human system. Herbal remedies were ingested, smoked, snorted, rubbed on the skin, and even used in the form of enemas to force rapid absorption of a substance into the blood stream. Cleansing techniques included fasting, sweating and purging flushed substances out of the body.

Medicine
Medicine men, known to the ancient Maya as ah-men, held the special ability to alter consciousness to determine causes for events not understood, such as reasons for illness or misfortune.

Since it was perceived by the Maya that sickness was a punishment for a mistake or transgression, it was important that the healer inquire about details of the past of the sick person. This was done in a methodological fashion, first inquiring about ascriptive attributes, followed by specific events of the person's life, and lastly about circumstantial or acquired attributes. This aspect of the medicine man's job would be similar to a modern-day therapy session.

In addition to ritualistic and spiritual elements, the medicine man had extensive knowledge of medicinal plants and how they should be used. After studying the symptoms of a sickness, a medicine man may prescribe a remedy to his patient. The number of times or days that the remedy should be ingested or applied depended on an individual's gender; typically the number thirteen was associated with men, and the number nine with women.

The Maya had a broad range of vocabulary to describe internal human anatomy, such as hobnel for intestines and kah for bile, as well as knowledge of general functions of body systems, in particular the female reproductive system. In pathology, over two hundred terms described organic conditions, such as thuhuzen meaning a deep bronchial cough, zen meaning largyneal cough, and tiptec meaning intestinal pain with pulsation, speculated to have been appendicitis. The Maya acknowledged mental afflictions such as melancholia and hallucinations, were capable of understanding the grouping of symptoms relating to contagious diseases, and identified several diseases including pinta and leishmaniasis.

The medicine men of ancient Maya society provided many services to their communities and were held in high regard. Known for their extensive knowledge and spirituality, medicine men were called upon for many reasons, but most often for their healing capabilities. These Maya doctors often employed specialists for specific healing techniques such as bone-setting and childbirth, similar to the method of modern doctors. Bone setting was done by a designated bone-binder, or kax-bac. In addition to his duties as a doctor and sorcerer, a medicine man not only cured diseases, but also sporadically accepted compensation to cause them. The ah-man was also called ah-pul-yaah, the "disease thrower".

New evidence indicates dental modification, widely established as an aesthetic practice, was also practiced for medical purposes; skeletal remains recovered at the Piedras Negras S-Sector site indicated dental extractions on teeth affected by caries among other methods of dental modification. Dental surgeons made jade and turquoise prostheses and filled teeth with iron pyrite for practical use past the well-documented aesthetic use of dental inlays for status display. Surgical practices included wound suturing with human hair and fish bones and fracture reduction.

Although a large number of Mesoamerican civilizations around the Classic period practiced trepanation with great dexterity and success, such as the Zapotec in Oaxaca, little evidence of drilling trepanation is found in the Maya region outside of skull impressions surmised to have more to do with cranioplasty than medical relief.

Ritual practices
Maya rituals differ from region to region, but many similar patterns in ceremonies, whether being performed for individual or group need, have been noted. First, all rituals are preceded by foresight of a medicine man, who determines the day of the ceremony through calendrical divination. The medicine men of the Ixil Maya of Guatemala, who kept track of days in their heads, would lay out red seeds from the coral tree onto the pre-Columbian calendar to count them and figure out what day best suited the specific ritual. As a symbol of a spiritual purification, the individual or individuals would observe a fasting and abstinence period before the ritual day.

Consistent patterns are shown throughout the Maya world as to the happenings of the day of the ritual as well. During the ceremony, elements including expulsion of the evil spirit from the participant, incensing of the idols, prayers, offerings, and sacrifices were all practiced. If the ritual was used to cure a disease, the offering may be in the form of food or ornaments, and sacrifice in the form of human bloodletting. Following the ceremony would be dancing, feasting, and ritual drinking by all, characterized by the Spaniards as a general drunkenness.

Today the Maya keep many of the ritualistic traditions of their ancestors. Elements of prayer, offerings, blood sacrifice (replacing human blood with that of sacrificed chickens), burning of copal incense, dancing, and ritual drinking continue in traditional ceremonies. It is noted that even ritualistic practice can have real effects on neurotransmitters and immunological functioning.

Sweat baths
An important purification element to the ancient Maya was the sweat bath, temezcal. Similar to a modern-day sauna, sweat baths were constructed of stone walls and ceilings, with a small opening in the top of the ceiling. Water poured onto the hot rocks in the room created steam, offering a setting in which to sweat out impurities. Sweat baths were used for a range of conditions and situations. New mothers who had recently conceived a child would seek revitalization in them, while people who were sick could find healing power in sweating.

Maya rulers made a habit out of visiting the sweat baths as well because it left them feeling refreshed and, as they believed, cleaner. In addition, Maya rulers performed ritual purification ceremonies to appease the gods and secure the well-being of their communities. It is hypothesized that kings popularized this method of healing because of their regular use of sweat baths. Archeologists have uncovered sweat baths at sites including Tikal, Aguateca and Nakbe, but the most impressive find to date is in Piedras Negras, a Classic Maya city in Guatemala. In addition to the recognizable palaces, temples and ball courts, archaeologists have uncovered eight stone buildings that served as sweat baths to the Maya royalty.  Steambaths are still in use among the contemporary Tzotzil and Tzeltal Maya of highland Chiapas, and are associated with a wide range of medicinal plants and postpartum therapies.

Plant and herbal medicine   
The study and observation of plants has been of high importance to the Maya for centuries. However, the study of medicinal plants was limited to the priestly class. Plants and herbal remedies were often used in collaboration with other techniques to cure disease. Knowledge of the effects of certain plants on human beings was often used to prescribe an antidote to a particular ailment, but it is also important to note that medicine men also frequently relied on the color of a plant or other remedy in certain situations. For instance, yellow plants and fruits were used in curing jaundice; red for problems characterized by blood; and burned feathers of red birds in curing yellow fever.

In cases of skin irritation, wounds and headaches, fresh vegetation was often used in the form of plasters applied directly to the skin.  Plasters were also rubbed on the skin to shield spirits. Depending on the ailment, plants were boiled and used in herbal drinks and/or baths, eaten raw, snorted, smoked, or inserted into one of the body's orifices. Common plants used for medicine include, but are not limited to, chili peppers, cacao, tobacco, agave, and the pitarilla tree. In addition, animal parts, such as those from the crocodile, insects, fish and birds were combined into the herbal concoctions. In most cases, a mixture of plant and animal product was prepared to cure a specific ailment.

Entheogens

For the most part, mind-altering substances were used in rituals by medicine men to achieve a higher state of consciousness or trance-like state. These substances were used for mental and spiritual health purposes. Flora such as peyote, the morning glory, certain mushrooms, tobacco, and plants used to make alcoholic substances, were commonly used. The smoking of tobacco mixed with other plants produced a trance-like state. Alcoholic substances were used at rituals and were extremely strong. Hallucinogens were used to communicate with the spirit world. A number of these substances were used not to cure sickness, but instead for pain relief. In addition, as depicted in Maya pottery and carvings, ritual enemas were used for a more rapid absorption and effect of the substance. In contrast to modern culture, these remedies were used to restore balance and harmony to the body.

Notes

References
 Anderson, E.N. (2005) Political Ecology in a Yucatec Maya Community. University of Arizona Press. 
 Benjamin, Patricia. (2006) Massage and Sweat baths Among the Ancient Maya. Massage Therapy Journal. Spring 2004:144-148.
 Colby, Benjamin N. (2004) Calendrical Divination by the Ixil Maya of Guatemala. In Divination and Healing: University of Arizona Press.
 Groark, Kevin P. (1997). "To Warm the Blood, to Warm the Flesh: The Role of the Steambath in Highland Maya (Tzeltal-Tzotzil) Ethnomedicine."  Journal of Latin American Lore 20(1):3-96.
 Groark, Kevin P. (2005).  "Vital Warmth and Well-being: Steambathing as Household Therapy among the Tzeltal and Tzotzil Maya of highland Chiapas, Mexico."  Social Science & Medicine 61:785-795.
 Groark, Kevin P. (2010).  "The Angel in the Gourd: Ritual, Therapeutic, and Protective Uses of Tobacco (Nicotiana tabacum) among the Tzeltal and Tzotzil Maya of Chiapas, Mexico." Journal of Ethnobiology 30(1):5-30.
 Houston, Stephen, David Stuart, and Karl Taube. (2006) The Memory of Bones. University of Texas Press.
 Kunow, Marianna. (2003) Maya Medicine. University of New Mexico Press. 
 Roys, Ralph L. (1931) The Ethno-Botany of the Maya. Tulane University.
 Sharer, Robert. (2006) The Ancient Maya. Stanford.

See also 
 Aztec medicine
 Curandero

External links
 Screening of plants used in Mayan traditional medicine to treat cancer-like symptoms.

Maya society
Mesoamerican medicine
Traditional medicine